Jon Hassell (March 22, 1937 – June 26, 2021) was an American trumpet player and composer. He was best known for developing the concept of "Fourth World" music, which describes a "unified primitive/futurist sound" combining elements of various world ethnic traditions with modern electronic techniques. The concept was first articulated on Fourth World, Vol. 1: Possible Musics, his 1980 collaboration with Brian Eno. 

Born in Tennessee, Hassell studied contemporary classical music in New York and later in Germany under composer Karlheinz Stockhausen. He subsequently worked with minimalist composers Terry Riley (on a 1968 recording of In C) and La Monte Young (as part of his Theatre of Eternal Music group), and studied under Hindustani singer Pandit Pran Nath. His association with Brian Eno in the early 1980s would introduce Hassell to a larger audience. He subsequently worked with musical artists such as Talking Heads, David Sylvian, Farafina, Peter Gabriel, Tears for Fears, Ani DiFranco, Techno Animal, Ry Cooder, Moritz von Oswald, and Carl Craig.

Life and career
Born in Memphis, Tennessee, United States, Hassell received his master's degree from the Eastman School of Music in Rochester, New York. During this time he became involved in European serial music, especially the work of Karlheinz Stockhausen, and so after finishing his studies at Eastman, he enrolled in the Cologne Course for New Music (founded and directed by Stockhausen) for two years, where he met Irmin Schmidt and Holger Czukay, who would later go on to form Can . Hassell returned to the U.S. in 1967, where he met Terry Riley in Buffalo, New York and performed on the first recording of Riley's seminal work In C in 1968. He pursued his Ph.D. in musicology in Buffalo and performed in La Monte Young's Theatre of Eternal Music in New York City, contributing to the 1974 LP Dream House 78' 17".

On his return to Buffalo in the early 1970s, Hassell was introduced to the music of Indian Pandit Pran Nath, a specialist in the Kiranic style of singing. Hassell, Young, Marian Zazeela, and Riley went together to India to study with Nath. His work with Nath awoke his appetite for traditional musics of the world, and on the album Vernal Equinox, he used his trumpet (treated with various electronic effects) to imitate the vocal techniques to which Nath had exposed him. He stated:

"From 1973 up until then I was totally immersed in playing raga on the trumpet. I wanted the physical dexterity to be able to come into a room and be able to do something that nobody else in the world could do. My aim was to make a music that was vertically integrated in such a way that at any cross-sectional moment you were not able to pick a single element out as being from a particular country or genre of music."

In 1980, he collaborated with Brian Eno on the album Fourth World, Vol. 1: Possible Musics and appeared on the Eno-produced Talking Heads album Remain in Light. The same year Hassell also performed solo at the Mudd Club. Plans had been made with Eno and David Byrne for the three of them to team up for what became "My Life in the Bush of Ghosts," but the plan fell through when Hassell didn't agree with the direction the tracks were taking. His 1981 release, Dream Theory in Malaya, led to a performance at the first World of Music, Arts and Dance (WOMAD) Festival, organized by Peter Gabriel. He performed and co-wrote tracks on David Sylvian's first solo album Brilliant Trees, and its instrumental EP follow-up Words with the Shaman. In the late 1980s, Hassell contributed to Gabriel's Passion, the soundtrack album for Martin Scorsese's film, The Last Temptation of Christ. Hassell and Pete Scaturro composed the electronic theme music for the television show The Practice.
In 1989, Hassell contributed to the Tears for Fears album The Seeds of Love.

Hassell died from natural causes on June 26, 2021 at the age of 84. He had had health issues over the course of the previous year.

Style

Hassell coined the term "Fourth World" to describe his work on "a unified primitive/futuristic sound combining features of world ethnic styles with advanced electronic techniques." He used extensive electronic processing of his trumpet playing. In addition to nonwestern traditional musics, critics have noted the influence of Miles Davis on Hassell's style, particularly Davis' use of electronics, modal harmony, minimal vibrato and understated lyricism. Both on record and during live performances, Hassell made use of western instruments—keyboards, bass, electric guitar, and percussion—to create modal, hypnotic grooves, over which he often played microtonally-inflected trumpet phrases in the style of Nath's Kiranic vocals. His use of circular breathing on the instrument enabled him to create long, seamless, and mesmerizing melodic lines.

Discography
As leader or co-leader
 Vernal Equinox (Lovely Music, 1977)
 Earthquake Island (Tomato 1978)
 Fourth World, Vol. 1: Possible Musics (Editions EG, 1980), with Brian Eno
 Dream Theory in Malaya: Fourth World Volume Two (Editions EG, 1981)
 Aka/Darbari/Java: Magic Realism (Editions EG, 1983)
 Power Spot (ECM, 1986)
 The Surgeon of the Nightsky Restores Dead Things by the Power of Sound (Intuition, 1987), live recordings
 Flash of the Spirit (Intuition/EMI Electrola, 1988), with Farafina
 City: Works of Fiction (Opal/Warner Bros., 1990; expanded edition on All Saints, 2014)
 Dressing for Pleasure (Warner, 1994), with Bluescreen
 Sulla Strada (Materiali Sonori, 1995), with I Magazzini
 The Vertical Collection (Sketches) (Earshot, 1997), with Peter Freeman as Bluescreen Project
 Fascinoma (Water Lily Acoustics, 1999)
 Hollow Bamboo (Water Lily Acoustics, 2000), with Ry Cooder, Ronu Majumdar and Abhijit Banerjee
 Maarifa Street: Magic Realism Volume Two (Label Bleu, 2005)
 Last Night the Moon Came Dropping Its Clothes in the Street (ECM, 2009)
 Listening to Pictures (Pentimento Volume One) (Ndeya, 2018)
 Seeing Through Sound (Pentimento Volume Two) (Ndeya, 2020)

Single tracks on compilations and remixes
 "Map of Dusk" on compilation Myths 3: La nouvelle serenité (Sub Rosa, 1987), recorded in 1985 with J.A. Deane
 "Pygmy Dance" on compilation Ai Confini / Interzone (New Tone, 1993), recorded live in Italy 1988
 "Streetfaxx" and remixes by 808 State on EP Voiceprint (Blind from the Facts) (Opal, 1990; reissued on All Saints, 1993 and 2006)
 Personals, maxi-single with remixes of "Personals" and "G-Spot" by MC 900 Ft Jesus and Organized Konfusion (Warner, 1994)
 "Then and Now (Berchidda)" on compilation Then and Now (Time in Jazz 1998 | 2007) (Tàjrà It., 2008), live recording from 2001 in Italy with John Beasley, Rick Cox

As sideman and guest appearances
On almost all recordings Jon Hassell played trumpet (sometimes merely 'used' as sound color). In cases where he plays keyboards or electronics it is mentioned in the last column; the same applies to the credits as composer (or producer).
Film soundtracks are labeled "O.S.T." (original sound track) preceding the film title. Artists and labels are linked by first appearance only.

See also 

 David Sylvian
 Erik Truffaz
 Erik Honoré
 List of ambient music artists
 Michael Brook
 Talking Heads

References

Bibliography
 Mark Prendergast, The Ambient Century. New York and London, Bloomsbury Publishing, 2000, 
 Jon Hassell, program notes from Vernal Equinox. Lovely Music, LML 1021, 1977.

External links

 
 Magic Realism, Vol. 2: Maarifa Street album site
 
 

1937 births
2021 deaths
American trumpeters
American male trumpeters
American male composers
21st-century American composers
Eastman School of Music alumni
Musicians from Memphis, Tennessee
Avant-garde trumpeters
All Saints Records artists
E.G. Records artists
Pupils of Karlheinz Stockhausen
Pupils of Pran Nath (musician)
21st-century trumpeters
21st-century American male musicians
Label Bleu artists